FENE-P is a continuous model of polymer. The name FENE stands for finitely extensible nonlinear elastic while P stands for the closure proposed by Peterlin. It takes the dumbbell version of the FENE model and assumed the Peterline statistical closure for the restoring force.

Advantages 
FENE-P is one of few polymer models that can be used in fluid dynamics simulations (CFD) since it removes the need of statistical averaging at each grid point at any instant in time. It is demonstrated to be able to capture some of the most important polymeric flow behaviors such as polymer turbulence drag reduction and shear thinning. It is the most commonly used polymer model that can be used in a turbulence simulation since turbulence DNS is already extremely expensive.

Disadvantages 
Due to its simplifications FENE-P is not able to show the hysteresis effects that polymers have, while the FENE model can.

References 
 Stretching of Polymers in Isotropic Turbulence: A Statistical Closure

Polymers